Datin Paduka A. Mangalam A/P S. Iyaswamy Iyer or better known as Mother Mangalam is a co-founder and the life chairman of the Pure Life Society. She is known as the "Malaysian Mother Teresa".

Early life and education 
Mother Mangalam was born in 1926 in Singapore. She went to Raffles Girls' School and Saradhamani Girls' School. She obtained a  Cambridge School Certificate at the Canossian Convent.

Career 
Mother Mangalam came to Malaya in 1948. She passed a teacher's training course and taught at a Tamil school in Bangsar, Kuala Lumpur.

She along with her mentor, Swami Satyananda founded the Pure Life Society in 1949. She was called 'Sister Mangalam' when she started working for the foundation. The title 'Mother' was bestowed upon her in 1985 by the society.

She authored three books, the first entitled Dew Drops on a Lily Pad, the second being History of Kuala Lumpur Schools in Tamil and the third book is entitled Mother. She has been a publisher of Dharma Quarterly since 1961.

She was appointed a member of Moral Education Committee of the Curriculum Development Centre. She was also appointed a member of the National Advisory Council for the Integration of Women in Development (NACIWID) by the Ministry of National Unity and Social Development.

She served as a Vice President of the Malaysia Inter-Religious Organization. Since 1986, she has been an Advisor for Inter-Faith Spiritual Fellowship.

She received the Pingat Jasa Kebangsaan from the Sultan of Selangor in 1955, the Tun Fatimah Gold Medal from the National Council of Women's Organizations in 1977 and the Kesatria Mangku Negara by the Yang di Pertuan Agong in 2002. She was also a recipient of the Merdeka Award in the Education and Community category for the year 2010.

References 

Living people
1926 births
Malaysian writers
Officers of the Order of the Defender of the Realm